Second Chance Animal Rescue Society (SCARS) is a no kill, non-profit animal rescue organization based in Edmonton and Athabasca, Alberta, serving northern Alberta, Canada. SCARS adopts out dogs and cats, keeping the animals in a foster setting rather than an animal shelter. Before adopting them out, each animal gets medical care, receives vaccinations and microchips, and are spayed or neutered.

History
The organization was cofounded by Sylvia Christiansen and Jan Pysyk in 2002 after they began rescuing dogs found in remote communities in northern Alberta. In the first year, about 70 dogs were helped, increasing to about 500 in 2008, with the aid of about 100 volunteers and 50 foster homes.

References

External links
 

2002 establishments in Alberta
Animal rescue groups
Animal charities based in Canada
Abandoned animals
Dog welfare organizations
Athabasca, Alberta
Organizations based in Alberta